Norris Stubbs (8 November 1948 – 9 August 2014) was a Bahamian sprinter. He competed in the men's 100 metres at the 1968 Summer Olympics.

References

1948 births
2014 deaths
Athletes (track and field) at the 1968 Summer Olympics
Bahamian male sprinters
Olympic athletes of the Bahamas
Sportspeople from Nassau, Bahamas